Wood spider may refer to:
 Huntsman spider, a spider in the family Sparassidae, some of which are also called wood spiders because of their attraction to woodpiles, wooden sheds, and other woody places
 Harpagophytum, a plant usually called devil's claw but also called wood spider

Animal common name disambiguation pages